The 2020 Ladies' National Football League, known for sponsorship reasons as the Lidl Ladies' National Football League, was a ladies' Gaelic football competition taking place in early 2020.

The league was originally scheduled to end in April 2020, but public health measures introduced to combat the COVID-19 pandemic in Ireland caused the competition to be cancelled in March 2020, and the leagues declared null and void.

Expected to resheluded for 2022 if safe.

Format

League structure
The 2020 Ladies' National Football League consists of three divisions of eight teams and one of seven. Each team plays every other team in its division once. 3 points are awarded for a win and 1 for a draw.

If two teams are level on points, the tie-break is:
 winners of the head-to-head game are ranked ahead
 if the head-to-head match was a draw, then whichever team scored more points in the game is ranked ahead (e.g. 1-15 beats 2-12)
 if the head-to-head match was an exact draw, ranking is determined by the points difference (i.e. total scored minus total conceded in all games)
 if the points difference is equal, ranking is determined by the total scored

If three or more teams are level on league points, rankings are determined solely by points difference.

Finals, promotions and relegations
The top two teams in Division 1 contest the Ladies' National Football League final.

The top two teams in divisions 2, 3 and 4 contest the finals of their respective divisions. The division champions are promoted.

The last-placed teams in divisions 1, 2 and 3 are relegated.

Division 1

Table

Final

Division 2

Table

Final

Division 3

Table

Final

Division 4

Table

Final

References

External links
2020 Lidl Ladies NFL Regulations

Football
 League
Ladies' National League
Ladies' National Football League seasons
Ladies National Football League